Kim Byeom-yong (김범용; born 29 July 1990 in South Korea) is a Korean footballer who since 2013 has played midfielder for Gyeongnam FC in the K League 2.

Career

Montedio Yamagata
Kim made his official debut for Montedio Yamagata in the J. League Division 2 on 5 May 2013 against Fagiano Okayama in City Light Stadium in Okayama, Japan. He subbed in the match in the 81st minute replacing Tomoyasu Hirose. Kim and his club lost the match 4-3.

Suwon FC
After 2017 season, he moves to Suwon FC.

Club career statistics
Updated to 10 December 2017.

References

External links 
 

Profile at JEF United Chiba

1990 births
Living people
Association football midfielders
South Korean footballers
J1 League players
J2 League players
K League 2 players
Montedio Yamagata players
Sanfrecce Hiroshima players
Shimizu S-Pulse players
JEF United Chiba players
Suwon FC players
South Korean expatriate footballers
South Korean expatriate sportspeople in Japan
Expatriate footballers in Japan